Walter Allen Robinson (1839 – 11 June 1895) was a British administrator who was appointed the first Principal of Aitchison College, Lahore, then in British India, on 20 November 1886.

Robinson was survived by his son, Sir Sydney Maddock Robinson, the Chief Justice of Burma and a daughter who was married in late April 1895, two months before her father died at 3 p.m. on 11 June 1895 of a sun stroke. He is buried in the Taxalie Gate cemetery in Lahore, Pakistan.

References

Date of birth missing
1895 deaths
1839 births
Heads of universities and colleges in India
Administrators in British India
Deaths from hyperthermia
People from Loughborough